This is a list of mosques in Georgia.

See also
 Islam in Georgia (country)
 Lists of mosques

References

External links

 
Georgia
Mosques